Walter Bandeira da Costa (born 25 March 1973) is a retired Angolan basketball point guard. Costa is a former member of the Angola national basketball team. At the 2004 Summer Olympics, the Angolan squad finished in last place and did not win a game.

He is currently the assistant coach of Angolan Basketball team Primeiro de Agosto.

External links
 
 Profile Yahoo! Sports

1973 births
Living people
Basketball players from Luanda
Angolan men's basketball players
Basketball players at the 2004 Summer Olympics
Point guards
Olympic basketball players of Angola
Atlético Sport Aviação basketball players
C.D. Primeiro de Agosto men's basketball players
African Games gold medalists for Angola
African Games medalists in basketball
2002 FIBA World Championship players
Competitors at the 2007 All-Africa Games